The 1922–23 season was Port Vale's fourth consecutive season of football (17th overall) in the English Football League. For the third successive the season the club finished just out of the relegation zones, and for the second successive season were unable to find a regular goalscorer following the sale of Bobby Blood. Financial issues continued to be a concern, especially when a former trainer reported the club for making illegal payments.

Overview

Second Division
The releasing of numerous experienced players in pre-season necessitated the signing of numerous new attacking players, namely Millwall winger Patrick Donoghue; 'robust' inside-right Jack Gordon from Queen's Park; James Smith from Plymouth Argyle; and Tom Reid from Ayr United.

The season opened with two defeats in August, and though things soon turned around it became clear that goals were at a premium. To solve this problem experienced winger Billy Harrison was signed from Manchester United. The "Valiants" duly did the double over the "Red Devils" with a 2–1 win at Old Trafford, and a 1–0 win at home thanks to a Harrison strike. Following an injury to the player the club suffered something of a blip in November. The following month the club spent £100 to bring Tom Butler from Darlaston. By the end of the calendar year the club were at the top end of the table, however a loss of form in January caused them to slip back down the table. In February, young Arthur Prince was promoted from the reserves and helped the club go four games unbeaten. The Vale finished out the season on hot and cold spells and ended up narrowly avoiding relegation.

At the end of season, Vale had made slight progress, having finished on 37 points, improving their tally of the previous two seasons by a single point. Their shocking home record was better only than bottom-placed Wolverhampton Wanderers, and Vale secured the fewest home wins and had the second-lowest goals scored tally at home – remarkably second place West Ham United had managed to score just two fewer than Vale at home. Their six wins away from home helped them avoid the drop.

Top scorer Tom Butler bagged nine goals in his 26 games, but no other player managed more than four goals. Six players were rarely out of the first eleven: goalkeeper Teddy Peers; defenders Peter Pursell and Len Birks; midfielders Ernest Collinge and Jack Hampson; and forward Billy Briscoe. At the end of the season, Billy Harrison joined Welsh club Wrexham, Jack Gordon went back to Scotland to sign with Greenock Morton, Teddy Peers retired, and Billy Briscoe refused a pay-cut and instead signed with nearby Congleton Town.

Finances
Finances were poor as attendances were disappointing, with The Sentinel'''s "Spectator" commenting that "Port Vale is respected everywhere, except in its own district". The ongoing Shilling Fund was useful for raising revenue, whilst £1,100 was written off by creditors in a remarkably charitable fashion. Yet in June 1923, the club was in trouble when former trainer Billy Barr reported Port Vale to the English Football League, accusing the club of having made illegal payments to its players throughout the season. The club was found guilty and was fined £100, with manager Joe Schofield also picking up a £25 fine. Three other officials were fined £150 in total, whilst seventeen players were each fined £1 each. This helped the club to report a loss of £2,400 on the season despite their tight spending. Gate receipts stood at just over £10,000, down almost 50% on 1920–21.

Cup competitions
Vale left the FA Cup at the Fifth Round of Qualifying after a disappointing 2–0 defeat by Third Division North Wrexham at The Old Recreation Ground. The end of season North Staffordshire Infirmary Cup Potteries derby bragging rights went to Stoke, which was scant consolation for a club who had just suffered relegation from the First Division. The match raised £250 for the local hospital.

League table

ResultsPort Vale's score comes first''

Football League Second Division

Results by matchday

Matches

FA Cup

North Staffordshire Infirmary Cup

Player statistics

Appearances

Top scorers

Transfers

Transfers in

Transfers out

References
Specific

General

Port Vale F.C. seasons
Port Vale